Jordan Vandermade (born 7 May 1987) is a television presenter in Auckland, New Zealand. He was a co-host on the popular children's television show Studio 2 until the series ended on 1 October 2010.

Educated at Saint Kentigern College in Auckland, he excelled in athletics, winning multiple national age-group events. His most significant achievement was winning the bronze medal in the World Junior Athletics Championship, in the decathlon event.

In 2007 he was recruited by Auckland Rugby Union and was part of the Auckland Academy. He played for the University club in Auckland who were runners up in the premier grade.

He hosted the short-lived TVNZ show The Singing Bee in 2008/9.

He also currently hosts the live lottery draws for Lotto New Zealand.  And is a Resident Auctioneer for UP Real Estate.

Achievements

See also
 List of New Zealand television personalities

References

Living people
1987 births
New Zealand television presenters
New Zealand decathletes
People educated at Saint Kentigern College